Al Wasl Football Club is an Emirati professional football club based in Dubai, that competes in the United Arab Emirates Football League. It is a part of the multi-sports club Al Wasl SC. Argentina-legend Diego Maradona was the manager of the club in 2011 and 2012. The club has a supporters group, named as the Ultras Tuna 30AED Each’’

History

Early years
Al Wasl was founded on 1960 as Zamalek Club when a group of young men gathered in Bakhit Salem's house in Zabeel to establish the club to practice their sporting hobbies. Members had to rent a small house, each paying 10 AED to support the club's budget. In 1962, the club moved to different house owned by Madia bint Sultan, and elected Ahmed bin Rashid Al Maktoum to be their club president. Around 1966 Zamalek would beat Al Shabab in a Canada dry championship which was their first achievement. In 1974 Al Orouba agreed to merge with Zamalek to form Al Wasl Club.

Rivalries
Al Wasl's main competitors would be Al Nasr who they compete with in the Bur Dubai Derby and Al Ain who are they challenge in the 'UAE Classico'.

Current squadAs of UAE Pro-League:Unregistered players

Out on loan

Honours and achievements
Domestic competitions
UAE League: 7
 Winner: 1981–82, 1982–83, 1984–85, 1987–88, 1991–92, 1996–97, 2006–07
President Cup: 2
 Winner: 1987, 2007
Federation Cup: 1
 Winner: 1992/93

 The IFFHS named Al Wasl as the UAE's Club of the 20th Century.

Regional competitions
 Gulf Club Champions Cup
Winner (1) : 2010Runners-up (2): 2005, 2012

Arab Club Champions Cup
 Semi-finals: 1998
 Quarter-finals: 2018–19

Friendly competitions
Dubai International Football Championship
 Winner: 2010
Performance in AFC competitions
AFC Champions League: 3 appearances
2008: Group stage
2018: Group stage
2019: Group stage

 Asian Club Championship: 4 appearances
1986: Qualifying Stage
1989–90: Qualifying Stage
1992–93: Third Place
1994–95: Quarter finals

Coaching staff

Managers

 Bakhit Salem (1960–1970)
 Ismail Al-Jarman (1971)
 Zaki Osman (1972–73)
 Dimitri Davidovic (1991–92)
 Arthur Bernardes (1996–98)
 Alain Laurier (1997–98)
 Paulo Campos (Jan 1999 – May 1999)
 Henryk Kasperczak (Sept 1999 – Feb 2000)
 Alain Laurier (2000 – May 2000)
 Josef Hickersberger (2000–2001)
 Johan Boskamp (2001–2002)
 Martín Lasarte (2002)
 Khalifa Mubarak Obaid Al Shamsi (March 2003)
 Arthur Bernardes (March 2003 – May 2004)
 Vinko Begović (2004–2005)
 Zé Mário (2006–2007)
 Miroslav Beránek (2007–2008)
 Alexandre Guimarães (1 July 2009 – May 2010)
 Khalifa Mubarak Obaid Al Shamsi (April 2010 – June 2011)
 Sérgio Farias (1 Aug 2010 – 19 April 2011)
 Diego Maradona (16 May 2011 – 10 July 2012)
 Bruno Metsu (17 July 2012 – 26 October 2012)
 Guy Lacombe (7 Nov 2012 – 18 February 2013)
 Eid Barout (17 Feb 2013 – 30 May 2013)
 Laurent Banide (2013)
 Héctor Cúper (2013–2014)
 Jorginho (2014)
 Gabriel Calderón (2014–2016)
 Rodolfo Arruabarrena (2016–2018)
 Gustavo Quinteros (2018)
 Laurențiu Reghecampf (2018–2020)
 Salem Rabie (2020)
 Odair Hellmann (2020–2022)
 Juan Antonio Pizzi (2022–present'')

Pro-League Record

Notes 2019–20 UAE football season was cancelled due to the COVID-19 pandemic in the United Arab Emirates.

Key
 Pos. = Position
 Tms. = Number of teams
 Lvl. = League

References

External links
Official Website

 
Football clubs in Dubai
Wasl
Association football clubs established in 1960
1960 establishments in the Trucial States